Lætitia Dosch (born 1 September 1980) is a French-Swiss actress, playwright and director. Her film credits include Age of Panic, Keeper, Summertime, Montparnasse Bienvenue, and Our Struggles.

Filmography

References

External links
 

1980 births
21st-century French actresses
Actresses from Paris
Cours Florent alumni
French film actresses
French television actresses
Living people